The navy of the Order of Saint John, also known as the Maltese Navy after 1530, was the first navy of a chivalric order. It was established in the Middle Ages, around the late 12th century. The navy reached its peak in the 1680s, during the reign of Grand Master Gregorio Carafa. It was disbanded following the French invasion of Malta in 1798, and its ships were taken over by the French Navy.

History

Middle Ages
The Knights Hospitaller were established in around 1099 to take care of pilgrims in the Holy Land. The Order was sanctioned by a papal bull in 1113, and eventually its role changed to include the defence of pilgrims as well. By the mid-12th century, the Order had purchased its first transport ships. Eventually, it began building its own ships, and had a shipyard in Acre. In the 1280s, the Order sent some ships to support the Aragonese Crusade.

Following the loss of Acre in 1291, the Hospitallers moved to Cyprus. Pope Nicholas IV encouraged the Hospitallers and other military orders such as the Knights Templar to build their own fleets, in order to enforce an embargo on Egypt. In December 1291, the Pope demanded that half of the Order's income in Europe was to be used to build up the fleet, and in January 1292, the Pope authorised the Order to use their new galleys to defend the Armenian Kingdom of Cilicia.

The first reference to an admiral of the Hospitaller fleet dates back to 1299. By 1306, the Order had drastically adapted to naval warfare, and it was beginning to become a maritime power.

Rhodes
The Order captured the island of Rhodes from the Byzantine Empire in 1309, and subsequently established its base there. Since the Order was now based on an island, its navy became an essential component for defence.

The Hospitallers fought several naval battles in the Aegean Sea during this period, such as the Battle of Chios in 1319, and supported operations with other crusader navies, such as at Euboea in 1344.

Malta

The Order lost Rhodes to the Ottoman Empire after a six-month long siege in 1522. After a couple of years of moving from place to place in Europe, Emperor Charles V offered the Order possession of the islands of Malta and Gozo, and the port of Tripoli. The Order arrived in Malta on 26 October 1530 on a number of ships, including the San Giovanni, Santa Croce, San Filippo, and the flagship Santa Anna.

While based in Malta, the Order and its navy participated in a number of naval battles against the Ottoman Navy or the Barbary pirates. The Order sent a carrack and four galleys to support the Spanish Empire and its allies in the conquest of Tunis in 1535. It also participated in the Battle of Preveza (1538), the Algiers expedition (1541) and Battle of Djerba (1560), in which the Ottomans were victorious over the Christian forces.

Four of the Order's galleys, Santa Fè, San Michele, San Filippo and San Claudio, capsized in a tornado in the Grand Harbour in 1555. They were replaced with funds sent from Spain, the Papal States, France and the Prior of St. Giles. One galley was built at the expense of Grand Master Claude de la Sengle.

When the city of Valletta began to be built in the 1560s, there were plans to build an arsenal and mandracchio for the Order's navy. The arsenal was never built, and while work started on the mandracchio, it stopped and the area became a slum known as the Manderaggio. Eventually, an arsenal was built in Birgu in 1597. A dock was built in Valletta's ditch in 1654, but it closed in 1685.

Three of the Order's ships participated in the Battle of Lepanto of 1571, which was a decisive victory for the Holy League. Ottoman power in the Mediterranean began to wane after this battle, and eventually the Order began to sanction corsairing against Muslim ships travelling near North Africa and the Levant.

The Hospitaller navy participated in a number of the Ottoman–Venetian Wars in the 17th and early 18th centuries. A notable engagement was the action of 28 September 1644, which led to the outbreak of the Cretan War. The navy reached its peak in the 1680s, during the magistracy of Gregorio Carafa. At this point, the dockyard in Birgu was enlarged.

The Order's navy and dockyard began to decline after around 1740, as part of the decline of the Order itself. Its last engagement was in the French invasion of Malta in 1798. On 10 June, a galley, two galleots and a chaloup sailed out of the Grand Harbour and made an unsuccessful attack against French forces landing at St. Julian's Bay and St. George's Bay.

Following the Order's capitulation on 12 June 1798, all its ships were all taken over by the French. The ships of the line San Zaccharia and San Giovanni and the frigate Sante Elisabeth were commissioned into the French Navy and were renamed Dégo, Athénien, and Carthaginoise. All three ships remained in Malta during the British blockade of Malta, and surrendered to the British in 1800. The British broke up Dégo and Carthaginoise, but commissioned Athénien into the Royal Navy as HMS Athenienne. She was wrecked off Sicily in 1806.

Ships

The Order's navy had a number of different types of ships over the centuries. Until the 17th century, the navy consisted mainly of galleys, which came in several sizes. At times, the navy also included galleons, carracks, frigates or xebecs.

The Grand Master also had a ceremonial barge, which was used for special occasions.

During the 18th century, the Order's navy also had a few ships of the line.

See also
Maritime Squadron of the Armed Forces of Malta, the present-day Maltese navy

References

 
Military history of the Knights Hospitaller
Disbanded navies
Military history of Malta
Military units and formations established in the 12th century
Military units and formations disestablished in 1798
Naval warfare of the Middle Ages
Naval warfare of the Early Modern period
1798 disestablishments in Malta